"Haven't Found" is a hip-hop song by Pras Michel, released as the first and only single from his second solo studio album, Win, Lose or Draw. The track features vocals from American singer Sharli McQueen. The single was released on June 6, 2005. The song is essentially a cover of U2's "I Still Haven't Found What I'm Looking For", from their album The Joshua Tree. The song was also included on the soundtrack to EA Sports' UEFA Euro 2012. The music video premiered in May 2005.

Track listing
 UK CD1
 "Haven't Found" (3:35)
 "Dreamin'" (Euro Remix) (4:41)

 UK CD2
 "Haven't Found" (3:35)
 "Haven't Found" (Shake Ya Cookie Remix) (4:18)
 "Light My Fire" (DJ Swami Remix) (5:57)
 "Haven't Found" (Video) (3:35)

 Australian CD single
 "Haven't Found" (3:35)
 "Haven't Found" (Instrumental) (3:35)
 "Win, Lose or Draw" (4:18)
 "Haven't Found" (Video) (3:35)

Charts

References

2005 singles
Pras songs
Songs written by Bono
Songs written by the Edge
2005 songs
Songs written by Pras